Auxerre – Branches Aerodrome  is an airport serving Auxerre and Branches, both communes of the Yonne department in the Bourgogne region of France.

Facilities

Statistics

References

External links
  Official Auxerre Airport website
  CCI de l'Yonne
 

Airports in Bourgogne-Franche-Comté
Buildings and structures in Yonne